In mathematics, especially in the area of abstract algebra, every module has an associated character module. Using the associated character module it is possible to investigate the properties of the original module. One of the main results discovered by Joachim Lambek shows that a module is flat if and only if the associated character module is injective.

Definition 

The group , the group of rational numbers modulo , can be considered as a -module in the natural way. Let  be an additive group which is also considered as a -module. The elements in this group are called characters. The character module can also be defined in the same way for right -modules.

Let  be left -modules and  an -homomorphismus. Character module formation is a contravariant functor from the category of left -modules to the category of right -modules.

Motivation 
The abelian group  is divisible and therefore an injective -module. Furthermore it has the following important property: Let  be an abelian group and  nonzero. This says that  is a cogenerator. With these properties one can show the main theorem of the theory of character modules: Theorem (Lambek): A left module  over a ring  is flat if and only if the character module  is an injective right -module.

Properties 
Let  be a left module over a ring  and  the associated character module. 

 The module  is flat if and only if  is injective (Lambek's Theorem).
With the previous property this module  is injective, hence every right -module is isomorphic to a submodule of an injective module. (Baer's Theorem)
 The module  is injective if and only if it is a direct summand of a character module of a free module.
Character module formation is a contravariant exact functor, i.e. it preserves exact sequences.
Let  be a right -module.

References 

Module theory